Zaldúa is a surname. Notable people with the surname include:

Domingo Zaldúa (1903–1980), Spanish footballer
Francisco Javier Zaldúa (1811–1882), Colombian politician
José Antonio Zaldúa (1941–2018), Spanish footballer
Joseba Zaldúa (born 1992), Spanish footballer
Narciso Clavería y Zaldúa, 1st Count of Manila (1795–1851), Spanish army officer